The Cornish Language Partnership is a representative body that was set up in Cornwall, England, UK in 2005 to promote and develop the use of the Cornish language. It is a public and voluntary sector partnership and consists of representatives from various Cornish language societies, Cornish cultural and economic organisations and local government in Cornwall. The organisation is part-funded by the European Union's Objective One programme, the United Kingdom government's Department for Communities and Local Government and Cornwall Council.

The Partnership is the chief regulator of the Standard Written Form of Cornish, an orthography that was published in 2008 with the intention of uniting the previous conflicting orthographies, and for use on road signs, in official documents, and in school examinations.

Organisations represented
 Agan Tavas
 Cussel an Tavas Kernuak
 Kesva an Taves Kernewek
 Kowethas an Yeth Kernewek

See also

 
 
 
 Language revitalization
 Languages in the United Kingdom
 List of language regulators
 
 Welsh Language Board /

References

External links

Cornish culture
Cornish language
Language regulators
Organisations based in Cornwall
Organizations established in 2005
2005 establishments in the United Kingdom